Erna Nixon Park is a public park located on 1200 Evans Road, Melbourne, Florida.  It contains a  elevated boardwalk through a natural Florida hammock.  The park contains ferns and old live oaks with hanging Spanish moss.  It provides a natural habitat for several species of birds and small animals, such as the gopher tortoise and indigo snake.  The park also hosts frequent events, such as the semi-annual Moonlight Stroll that takes place in the evening and includes live music.  The park is named after Melbourne Village naturalist Erna Nixon (B: November 3, 1891).

The Erna Nixon Park Nature Center features exhibits of animal mounts and live small animals.

Notes

Gallery

External links
"Erna Nixon Park".  Official webpage from Brevard County Parks and Recreation website.

Melbourne, Florida
Parks in Brevard County, Florida
Nature centers in Florida